'Sunkoshi Marin Diversion Project' (सुनकोशी मरिन डाइभर्सन आयोजना) is one of the National Pride Projects being developed by Ministry of Energy, Water Resources and Irrigation (Nepal). The project got status of National Pride Projects in 20 January 2020.

The project is an inter-basin transfer project to transfer water from Sunkoshi River to the Marin Khola, a tributary of Bagmati River. The flow will be discharged to the Bagmati Irrigation System to irrigate additional 122,000 ha of land in Rautahat, Dhanusha, Mahottari, Sarlahi and Bara.

The design flow of the project is 77 m3/s. The intake has a 12 m high diversion dam in Sunkoshi river. The flow is transferred via 13.3 km long tunnel. The project also has a power station to generate 31 MW of electricity. The powerhouse is located in Kamalamai municipality.

The project cost is NPR 37.2 billion for irrigation and NPR 46.19 billion for hydro-electricity.

See also
List of National Pride Projects of Nepal

References

Irrigation in Nepal
Interbasin transfer
National Pride Projects